Orenaia pallidivittalis is a moth in the family Crambidae. It was described by Eugene G. Munroe in 1956. It is found in North America, where it has been recorded from British Columbia.

References

Evergestinae
Moths described in 1956